Taganrog Military Museum is the first private military museum in the Russian city of Taganrog. Its exhibits includes displays of military vehicles and weapons.

Museum history
The start of museum exhibition creation refers to May 9, 2004, when the club Auto-Retro Taganrog was founded.

On the night of October 25, 2014, the building of the Taganrog Military Museum and all of its exhibits were completely destroyed by fire.

Museum exhibits

Cars and motorcycles
 GAZ-AA truck (in Russian)
 GAZ-67 jeep
 BA-64 armoured car
 Opel P4 car (in Russian)
 Opel Olympia car
 TIZ-AM-600 motorcycle (in Russian)
 М-72 motorcycle
 BMW R12 motorcycle
 Victoria Aero motorcycle
 NSU 251OSL motorcycle

Weapon full-scale mockups
 Shpagin machine pistol (PPSh-41)
 Sudaev's submachine-gun (PPS)
 Tokarev Self-loading Rifle (SVT-40)
 Thompson submachine gun
 Mosin–Nagant
 Nagant M1895 Revolver
 Tokarev self-loading pistol
 Makarov pistol
 Volkov-Yartsev VYa-23 aircraft autocannon
 Degtyaryov's machine gun (DP, DT)
 PTRD anti-tank rifle
 PTRS-41 anti-tank rifle
 Maschinengewehr 34 (MG 34) machine gun
 MP 40 submachine gun
 Karabiner 98 Kurz bolt-action rifle
 Mauser C96 semi-automatic pistol
 Walther P38 semi-automatic pistol
 Luger P08 pistol (Parabellum)

Other exhibits
Ammunition mockups, cold weapons, military uniform, documents, household goods and other relics.

Gallery

Location and opening hours
 Location: Russian Federation, Taganrog, st. Lesnaya Birzha, 20 b
 Opening hours:
 summer:  9:00 until 17:00
 winter, spring, autumn: Mon-Fri 9:00 until 17:00, Sat 9:00 until 15:00, day off - Sun

References

External links

 Taganrog military museum official website (in Russian)

World War II museums in Russia
History museums
Military and war museums in Russia
History museums in Russia
Military history of Russia
Military history of the Soviet Union
Museums in Taganrog